The sack of Vieste was led by Dragut and took place on the 15th of July in 1554. This sack resulted in the capture of the fortress, a massacre and the enslavement of thousands.

On July 15th in the year of 1554 Dragut landed in Vieste with 60 or 70 galleys. Upon his arrival the inhabitants of Vieste took shelter between a cathedral and castle which they had barricaded. The Italians negotiated a surrender and delivered gold and silver hoping it would be enough to save Vieste.

They opened the doors on the 24th of July and the Turks entered and began sacking the town. The archpriest of Vieste and his family were taken captive and ransomed.

5,000 to 7,000 inhabitants were enslaved and Dragut ordered the beheading of everyone he was unable to carry off in slavery resulting in 5,000 beheaded. One source claims the entire population of Vieste was beheaded and this event has been described as a massacre. Another raid occurred in Naples the same year where Algerians took 7,000 slaves.

See also
Sack of Lipari

References

Vieste
Kingdom of Naples
Ottoman Empire
Battles involving the Ottoman Empire